Gek Poh Ville is a residential precinct in Jurong, named after 'Gek Poh Road', a street that existed before Pioneer was developed.

It is used to be part of Hong Kah North SMC, now West Coast GRC and the area's residential areas are under the management of West Coast Town Council, with Foo Mee Har representing the residents of Gek Poh Ville in parliament.

The Singapore Boys Home, Saint Joseph's Home and Thonghup Gardens (Plant Nursery) are also located in the precinct.

History
Before the construction of HDB flats on Jurong West Neighbourhoods 7 and 8 it was previously a village called 'Gek Poh Village' while the site of Jurong West Neighbourhood 2 was a cemetery called 'Bulim Cemetery' before it makes way for redevelopment in the late 1990s'.

Transportation

Roads
The main roads in the precinct are Jurong West Avenue 3/4/5 and Jalan Bahar, which connects the precinct to the rest of the island through the PIE(exits 36), with minor roads (Jurong West Street23/24/25/72/73/74/75) winding through the various zones in the precinct.

Schools
There are 3 primary schools (Corporation Primary School, Westwood Primary School and Pioneer Primary School)
There were actually 2 secondary schools but Pioneer Secondary School was merged into Boon Lay Secondary School. Therefore In Gek Poh Ville, there is only 1 secondary school (Westwood Secondary School) and many childcare centres in the precinct.

Recreational
The Jalan Bahar Park is the major park, apart from the many playing courts and exercise corners across the precinct. A jogging-cum-cycling dual track runs through zone 7 of the precinct. The nearest sports and recreational centre is the Jurong West Sports and Recreation Centre, which is accessible from the various zones through bus services 185 and 243.

Town centre
The precinct's town centre is zone 2 of the precinct, comprising HDB-managed flats and the Gek Poh Shopping Centre, providing the basic necessities for the people of Gek Poh Ville.  Bus connection to the town centre is available through bus service 181,185 and 243.

Additionally, the ground floor of Block 276 which is a multi-storey car park houses a coffee shop, some provision shops, ATM, stationery shops, clinics as well as a Singapore Pools outlets that caters to the residents and students needs.

Places of worship
North of the town centre is the Victory Family Centre, which provides religious services.

Community centre
The precinct's community centre is located here, at the junction of Jurong West Street 75 and 74.

Future developments
At the North-East side of the precinct it will be developed into an industrial park called 'Bulim Industrial Estate' in which there will be factories, warehouses as well as a bus park for SMRT Buses.

References

External links
West Coast Town Council
Neighbourhood Complex : Block 762 Jurong West Street 75 on HDB Infoweb
Gek Poh Ville Website

Places in Singapore